The Kembavuta is a Kannada weekly newspaper published in Karnataka, India.  It is the official organ of the Karnataka State Council of the Communist Party of India.   Shivaraj R Biradar is the editor of Kembavuta.

References

Communist periodicals published in India
Communist Party of India
Communist newspapers
Kannada-language newspapers
1974 establishments in Karnataka